Michael Mmoh was the defending champion but lost in the semifinals to Daniel Altmaier.

Christopher Eubanks won the title after defeating Altmaier 6–3, 6–4 in the final.

Seeds

Draw

Finals

Top half

Bottom half

References

External links
Main draw
Qualifying draw

Knoxville Challenger - 1
2021 Singles